Michael George Dixon (12 October 1943 – 30 January 1993) was an English professional footballer who played as a goalkeeper.

Career
Born in Reading, Dixon played for Reading, Aldershot and Salisbury City.

References

1943 births
1993 deaths
English footballers
Reading F.C. players
Aldershot F.C. players
Salisbury City F.C. players
English Football League players
Association football goalkeepers